Tyler Joseph Cunningham Matas (born August 3, 1994) is a footballer who plays as a defender. He last played for Philippines Football League club Kaya F.C.-Iloilo.

Education
Matas attended Notre Dame de Namur University for his collegiate studies.

Collegiate career
Matas played for the football team of his college, Notre Dame de Namur University in the NCAA Division II. In his freshman year, he was named as NDNU's Male Freshman Athlete of the year. In his sophomore and junior years, he was named as NDNU's Male Athlete of the year award.

Club career

Burlingame Dragons
In 2016, after training with LA Galaxy during the off-season, Matas joined Premier Development League club Burlingame Dragons.

Meralco Manila
In 2017, Matas joined Philippines Football League club Meralco Manila.

In January 2018, it was announced that Meralco Manila have ceased operations. The management stated that they attempted to find investors to keep the club running but were unable to do so.

Davao Aguilas
In February 2018, Matas joined Mindanao-based Philippines Football League club Davao Aguilas.

After the 2018 season, it was reported on December 14, 2018 that Davao Aguilas has withdrawn from the PFL. Reasons for the withdrawal is yet to be officially disclosed by club owner Jefferson Cheng who iterated continued support for infrastructure and grassroots development in Davao. He is set to discuss with the club's stakeholders over the fate of the club itself. Cheng has also cited the decision to hire Bernie Sumayao to manage the PFL despite his volunteering to take over the management of the league.

Kaya
In February 2019, Matas joined Kaya F.C.-Iloilo after the folding of Davao Aguilas.

International career
Born in Honolulu, Hawaii to Filipino parents, Matas is eligible to represent United States and Philippines at international level.

Philippines
In August 2017, Matas was named in the Philippines' 23-man squad for their 2019 AFC Asian Cup qualifiers against Yemen on 5 September 2017.

References

External links
 
 

1994 births
Living people
Association football defenders
Filipino footballers
Soccer players from Honolulu
Citizens of the Philippines through descent
American people of Filipino descent
American soccer players
Filipino people of American descent
F.C. Meralco Manila players